This page details the Tahiti national football team records and statistics; the most capped players, the players with the most goals and Tahiti's match record by opponent.

Individual records

Player records

Most capped players

Top goalscorers

Manager records

Team records

Competition records

FIFA World Cup

FIFA Confederations Cup

OFC Nations Cup

Pacific Games

Polynesia Cup

Coupe de l'Outre-Mer

Head-to-head record 
The lists shown below detail the national football team of Tahiti's all-time international record against opposing nations.

The Tahiti national football team is the national team of French Polynesia and is controlled by the Fédération Tahitienne de Football. The team consists of a selection of players from French Polynesia, not just Tahiti.

Tahiti played their first full match on 21 September 1952 when they recorded a 2–2 draw at home against New Zealand. Their first competitive match came almost 11 years later when they entered the South Pacific Games for the first time in 1963, finishing third.

The following tables show Tahiti's all-time international record, correct as of 27 March 2022 vs. New Zealand.

AFC

CAF

CONCACAF

CONMEBOL

OFC

UEFA

Full Confederation record

References

Tahiti national football team
National association football team records and statistics